Wadi Iyal Ali is a sub-district located in Maswar District, 'Amran Governorate, Yemen. Wadi Iyal Ali had a population of 2418  according to the 2004 census.

References 

Sub-districts in Maswar District